The women's shot put event at the 1988 Summer Olympics in Seoul, South Korea had an entry list of 26 competitors, with two qualifying groups before the final (12) took place on Saturday October 1, 1988.

Medalists

Abbreviations
All results shown are in metres

Records

Qualification

Group A

Group B

Final

See also
 1986 Women's European Championships Shot Put (Stuttgart)
 1987 Women's World Championships Shot Put (Rome)
 1990 Women's European Championships Shot Put (Split)
 1991 Women's World Championships Shot Put (Tokyo)

References

External links
  Official Report
  todor66

S
Shot put at the Olympics
1988 in women's athletics
Women's events at the 1988 Summer Olympics